The Šerkšnys, or Šerkšnė, is a river of Kėdainiai district municipality, Kaunas County, central Lithuania. The river flows into the Nevėžis, a tributary of the Neman.

It begins nearby Nociūnai village and flows westwards on the Kėdainiai Industrial Zone surroundings. The Šerkšnys meets the Nevėžis next to Paobelys village.

The hydronym is derived from Lithuanian adjective šerkšnas ('hoar, hoary, greyish').

References

Rivers of Lithuania
Kėdainiai District Municipality